This is a list of members of the Western Australian Legislative Assembly from 2021 to 2025.

List of members

  Vince Catania resigned on 8 August 2022. A by-election to replace him was held on 17 September 2022, in which Merome Beard was elected.

Members of Western Australian parliaments by term
Western Australian Legislative Assembly